The 2014–15 season was the 116th season of competitive league football in the history of English football club Wolverhampton Wanderers. The club competed in the second tier of the English football system, the Football League Championship, following their return to the second level after being promoted as champions from League One at the first attempt.

The club finished the season in seventh position, missing out on a play-off place on goal difference. Their tally of 78 points represented the highest points tally not to earn a play-off place since the system was introduced.

Season review
Following their record-breaking promotion from League One, pre-season training began on 26 June with Wolves having already made two of their three summer signings with Tommy Rowe and Rajiv van La Parra arriving on free transfers; Chelsea academy graduate George Saville would join for a fee in late August but fail to make any impact before being loaned out. The transfer window saw deals reached to remove some of the club's transfer listed players from the wage bill with Tongo Doumbia, Jamie O’Hara and Stephen Ward all moving on.

The season began with a 1–0 win over newly relegated Norwich, which was soon followed by two further 1–0 wins against the other two teams to have fallen out of the Premier League, Fulham and Cardiff, respectively. The team lost just twice in their opening 15 league fixtures, bringing them a place in the top 4 of the division. However, a lengthy hamstring injury to striker Nouha Dicko left the team lacking attacking options, with Leon Clarke having scored just once. The loan acquisition of Hull striker Yannick Sagbo failed to solve the issue as the player's lack of fitness became apparent and the deal was cut short. A second Premier League striker was loaned in with Sunderland's Danny Graham then having a six-week stay but providing only one goal. During this time Wolves suffered five defeats in a row, their worst run at Championship level since 1991, dropping them into mid-table.

With Dicko regaining fitness by the Christmas period, the team went two months undefeated and bolstered their attacking threat by signing Benik Afobe from Arsenal, who had led the goalscoring charts while on loan at League One side MK Dons. The January window saw the departures of two further transfer listed players, Roger Johnson and Kevin Foley. The following months saw the team regain a footing in the promotion race, as they became one of the eight clubs at the top of the division to break clear of the remaining teams.

After sitting in 8th place for several weeks, a run of four consecutive victories in late March/early April allowed them to finally break back into the play-off positions. However, they immediately suffered two consecutive losses - at local rivals Birmingham and promotion contenders Middlesbrough - that dropped them again down to 8th. After a home match against fellow play-off challenger Ipswich, managed by former Wolves manager Mick McCarthy, finished 1–1, Wolves were left needing to hope that teams above them would drop sufficient points in the final two rounds of games to allow them back into the top 6. Although Wolves won their final two games to catch Ipswich on points, their goal difference proved insufficient to overtake either the East Anglian club or Brentford, who had been promoted as runners-up behind Wolves in the previous season. Wolves' tally of 78 points was the highest-achieved to date by a team that did not qualify for the play-offs since their introduction.

Results

Pre season

Championship

A total of 24 teams competed in the Football League Championship in the 2014–15 season. Each team played every other team twice, once at their stadium, and once at the opposition's. Three points were awarded to teams for each win, one point per draw, and none for defeats. 

The provisional fixture list was released on 18 June 2014, but was subject to change in the event of matches being selected for television coverage or police concerns.

Matches

Results summary

Results by round

League table

FA Cup

League Cup

Players

Statistics

|-
|align="left"|||align="left"|||align="left"| 
|33||0||2||0||0||0||35||0||0||0||
|-
|align="left"|||align="left"|||align="left"| 
|||0||2||0||1||0||||0||4||1||
|-
|align="left"|||align="left"|||align="left"| 
|||0||0||0||0||0||||0||2||0||
|-
|align="left"|||align="left"|||align="left"| 
|||6||||2||||0||||8||3||0||
|-
|align="left"|||align="left"|||align="left"| 
|||0||2||0||1||0||||0||11||0||
|-
|align="left"|||align="left"|||align="left"| 
|44||4||2||0||0||0||46||4||7||0||
|-
|align="left"|||align="left"|||align="left"| 
|||5||2||0||1||0||||5||1||0||
|-
|align="left"|||align="left"|||align="left"|  †
|0||0||0||0||0||0||0||0||0||0||
|-
|align="left"|||align="left"|||align="left"|  ¤
|||0||0||0||0||0||style="background:#98FB98"|||0||3||0||
|-
|align="left"|||align="left"|FW||align="left"|  ¤
|||2||||0||1||0||||2||3||0||
|-
|align="left"|10||align="left"|||align="left"| 
|||15||1||0||||0||||15||2||1||
|-
|align="left"|11||align="left"|||align="left"| 
|||0||1||0||0||0||||0||8||1||
|-
|align="left"|12||align="left"|FW||style="background:#faecc8; text-align:left;"|  ‡
|||0||0||0||0||0||style="background:#98FB98"|||0||0||0||
|-
|align="left"|12||align="left"|FW||style="background:#faecc8; text-align:left;"|  ‡
|||1||0||0||0||0||style="background:#98FB98"|||1||0||0||
|-
|align="left"|12||align="left"|FW||align="left"| 
|||13||0||0||0||0||style="background:#98FB98"|||13||1||0||
|-
|align="left"|13||align="left"|||align="left"| 
|0||0||0||0||1||0||||0||0||0||
|-
|align="left"|14||align="left"|||align="left"| 
|||1||2||0||1||0||||1||6||0||
|-
|align="left"|15||align="left"|||align="left"| 
|||0||0||0||0||0||style="background:#98FB98"|||0||0||0||
|-
|align="left"|16||align="left"|FW||align="left"|  ¤
|||0||0||0||0||0||||0||0||0||
|-
|align="left"|17||align="left"|||align="left"| 
|||1||1||1||0||0||style="background:#98FB98"|||2||2||1||
|-
|align="left"|18||align="left"|||align="left"|  (c) ¤
|||0||0||0||1||1||||1||2||0||
|-
|align="left"|19||align="left"|||align="left"|  ¤
|||1||2||0||1||0||||1||5||0||
|-
|align="left"|20||align="left"|FW||align="left"|  ¤
|||0||1||0||1||0||||0||0||0||
|-
|align="left"|21||align="left"|||align="left"|  ¤
|0||0||0||0||0||0||0||0||0||0||
|-
|align="left"|23||align="left"|||align="left"| 
|||2||0||0||1||0||||2||2||0||
|-
|align="left"|27||align="left"|||align="left"|  ¤
|||0||0||0||1||0||||0||0||0||
|-
|align="left"|29||align="left"|||align="left"| 
|13||0||0||0||0||0||style="background:#98FB98"|13||0||0||0||
|-
|align="left"|30||align="left"|||align="left"|  ¤
|||0||0||0||0||0||style="background:#98FB98"|||0||1||0||
|-
|align="left"|31||align="left"|||align="left"|  ¤
|0||0||0||0||0||0||0||0||0||0||
|-
|align="left"|32||align="left"|||align="left"|  ¤†
|0||0||0||0||0||0||0||0||0||0||
|-
|align="left"|33||align="left"|||align="left"| 
|20||0||2||0||0||0||style="background:#98FB98"|22||0||4||0||
|-
|align="left"|39||align="left"|FW||align="left"| 
|0||0||0||0||0||0||0||0||0||0||
|-
|align="left"|40||align="left"|FW||align="left"| 
|||14||||0||||1||||15||5||0||
|}

Awards

Transfers

In

Out

Loans in

Loans out

Management and coaching staff

Kit
The season brought both new home and away kits again manufactured by supplier PUMA. The new home kit featured the club's traditional gold and black colours with black arms, which had been worn on the final day of the previous season, while the away kit was an all white design with black collar. Both shirts featured sponsor What House? for a second and final season.

References

2014–15 Football League Championship by team
2014–15